The 2011/12 season was Loyola's 3rd season in the Philippines premier league, the UFL. The club competed in the Division 1 of the United Football League where they finished 3rd. The club also competed in the 2011 UFL Cup and finished second place behind Philippine Air Force.

The club was also invited to play in 2012 Singapore Cup and finished fourth place after they suffered a defeat against Gombak United on the third-place playoff match.

Squad

Out on loan

Competitions

Overview

UFL Division 1

League table

Matches

UFL Cup

Singapore Cup

Notes

References

F.C. Meralco Manila seasons
2012 in Philippine football